Nelson Cárcamo Barrera is the current governor of the Chilean province of Antártica Chilena.

References

Governors of provinces of Chile
Antártica Chilena Province
Place of birth missing (living people)
Year of birth missing (living people)
Living people